The Isetta is an Italian-designed microcar built under license in a number of different countries, including Argentina, Spain, Belgium, France, Brazil, Germany, and the United Kingdom. Because of its egg shape and bubble-like windows, it became known as a bubble car, a name also given to other similar vehicles.

It was the top-selling single-cylinder car in the world, with 161,728 units sold.

Initially manufactured by the Italian firm Iso SpA, the name Isetta is the Italian diminutive form of Iso, meaning "little Iso".

The Isetta was featured on “Family Matters” as Steve Urkel’s car starting in season four.


Iso Isetta (Italy) 

The car originated with the Italian firm of Iso SpA. In the early 1950s the company was building refrigerators, motor scooters and small three-wheeled trucks. Iso's owner, Renzo Rivolta, decided to build a small car for mass distribution. By 1952 the engineers Ermenegildo Preti and Pierluigi Raggi had designed a small car that used the motorcycle engine of the Iso Moto 200 and named it Isetta.

The Isetta caused a sensation when it was introduced to the motoring press in Turin in November 1953. It was unlike anything seen before. In the event of an accident, the driver and passenger were to exit through the canvas sunroof. The steering wheel and instrument panel swung out with the single door, simplifying access to the single bench seat. The seat provided reasonable comfort for two occupants, and perhaps a small child. Behind the seat was a large parcel shelf with a spare wheel located below. A heater was optional. Ventilation was provided by turning out the front triangle windows and or opening the fabric sunroof.

The engine was started by a combination generator-starter known as Dynastart. A manual gearbox provided four forward speeds and reverse. A chain drive connected the gearbox to a solid rear axle with a pair of closely spaced  rear wheels. This narrow track eliminated the need for a differential. The front axle was a modified version of a Dubonnet independent front suspension.

The Isetta took over 30 seconds to reach  from rest.

In 1954, Iso entered several Isettas in the legendary Mille Miglia where they took the top three spots in the economy classification. However, despite its initial success, the Isetta was beginning to slip in popularity at home, mainly due to renewed competition from Fiat with its 500C model.

Renzo Rivolta wanted to concentrate on his new Iso Rivolta sports car, and was interested in doing licensing deals. Plants in Spain and Belgium were already assembling Isettas and Autocarros using Italian-made Iso components. BMW began talking with Rivolta in mid-1954 and bought not just a license but the complete Isetta body tooling as well. Rivolta also negotiated licensing deals with companies in France and Brazil.

After constructing some 1,000 units, production of the Italian built cars ceased in 1955, but Iso continued to build the Isetta in Spain until 1958.

Iso Autocarro 

In addition to the Iso Isetta vettura described above, Iso also built the Autocarro, a commercial version with full-width rear axle. The Autocarro was offered in several body styles—a flatbed pickup, enclosed truck, a tilt-bed or even a fire engine—although some of these might not have been sold. The Autocarro was very popular in Italy, and many manufacturers produced some variant of the type.

Iso had previously produced a motorcycle-type Isocarro. The Iso Autocarro was larger than most, with its four-wheel layout, conventional rear axle with differential and leaf springs, and a large tubular frame. It could carry a  load. The name Isetta Autocarro was also used. It is thought that more than 4,000 Autocarros were built.

VELAM Isetta (France) 

In 1954, VELAM acquired a licence from Iso to manufacture a car based on the Isetta. Since Iso had sold the body making equipment to BMW, VELAM developed their own body but used the original Iso engine. The VELAM body was rounder and more egg-like than Iso's Isetta and was known by the French as the 'yogurt pot'. Instead of a chassis like the Italian and German versions, there was a sub-frame bolted to the body at the rear, which held the rear tires, engine, and transmission. The front suspension was bolted to the front of the body. The front door was opened by push button instead of a handle, and the speedometer was mounted in the center of the steering wheel.

VELAM started production of the car in 1955 at the old Talbot factory at Suresnes, France, and the car was introduced at the 1955 Paris car show. All told, five versions of the car were built: the standard Isetta, a convertible version, a luxury version, a one-off "Sport" version, and a race car. Due to competition from the Renault Dauphine, production ceased in 1958.

De Carlo - Isetta (Argentina)

Metalmecánica Company, joined the regime automotive manufacturing 1959, starting the assembly of licensed vehicles BMW (Isetta and BMW 700), in 1964, Metalmecánica redesigns the front and back of the De Carlo 700, becoming its first redesign made in Argentina, in 1965 begins to assemble under license of the French company SIMCA, the model Ariane.

Some 1,413 of the De Carlo 600 were manufactured from 1959 to 1962

Romi-Isetta (Brazil)

In 1955, Iso licensed the Isetta to Indústrias Romi S.A., a machine-tool manufacturer headquartered in the city of Santa Bárbara d'Oeste, in the State of São Paulo. The Isetta was chosen, because it was considered an ideal vehicle for use in the cities by virtue of its size and economy. Released on September 5, 1956, it was one of the first cars produced in Brazil, after Ford do Brasil and General Motors do Brasil. The car had received government approval as a part of a state-supported drive to establish an automotive industry in Brazil, but ended up being built without government backing.

Some 3,000 of the Romi-Isettas were manufactured from 1956 to 1961. They kept the Iso design and used Iso engines until 1958, in 1959 they switched to the BMW 300 cc engines.

BMW Isetta (Germany)
BMW made the Isetta its own. They redesigned the powerplant around a BMW one-cylinder, four-stroke, 247 cc motorcycle engine which generated . Although the major elements of the Italian design remained intact, BMW re-engineered much of the car, so much so that none of the parts between a BMW Isetta Moto Coupe and an Iso Isetta are interchangeable. The first BMW Isetta appeared in April 1955.

In May 1962, three years after launching the conventionally modern-looking BMW 700, BMW ceased production of Isettas. A total of 161,728 units had been built.

In the 1990s, the BMW Isetta had garnered a resurgence through the television show Family Matters, in which one of the main characters, Steve Urkel (Jaleel White), drives a 1960 BMW Isetta.

BMW Isetta 250
While it retained the "bubble window" styling, it differed from the Italian model in that its headlamps were fixed separately to the sides of the bodywork and it carried the BMW badge below the windscreen. The car was also redesigned to take a modified version of the 250 cc four-stroke engine from the BMW R25/3 motorcycle and the front suspension was changed. The single-cylinder generated  at 5800 rpm. The crankcase and cylinder were made of cast iron, the cylinder head of aluminium. However, the head was rotated by 180° compared with the motorcycle engine. The twin-bearing crankshaft was also different in the Isetta power unit, being larger and featuring reinforced bearings. One of the reasons for this was the heavy Dynastart unit which combined the dynamo and self-starter. The fuel mixture was provided by a Bing sliding throttle side draft motorcycle carburetor. In addition to further changes of detail, the BMW engineers enlarged the sump for installation in the car and cooled the engine by means of a radial fan and shrouded ducting.

The power train from the four-speed gearbox to the two rear wheels was also unusual: fixed to the gearbox output drive was something called a Hardy disc, which was a cardan joint made of rubber. On the other side of it was a cardan shaft, and finally a second Hardy disc, which in turn was located at the entrance to a chain case. A duplex chain running in an oil bath led finally to a rigid shaft, at each end of which were the two rear wheels. Thanks to this elaborate power transfer, the engine-gearbox unit was both free of tension and well soundproofed in its linkage to the rear axle.

In Germany, the Isetta could even be driven with a motorcycle license.

The first BMW Isetta rolled off the line in April 1955, and in the next eight months some 10,000 were produced.

BMW Isetta 300

In 1956, the government of the Federal Republic of Germany changed the regulations for motor vehicles. Class IV licences issued from that time onward could only be used to operate small motorcycles and could no longer be used to operate motor vehicles with a capacity of less than 250 cc. At the same time, the maximum capacity allowed for the Isetta's tax category was 300 cc. Class IV licences issued before the change in the regulations were grandfathered and allowed to be used as before.

This change in regulations encouraged BMW to revise their Isetta microcars. In February 1956 a 300cc engine was introduced. The engineers enlarged the single cylinder to a  bore and  stroke, which gave a displacement of exactly 298 cc; at the same time, they raised the compression ratio from 6.8 to 7.0:1.

In October 1956, the Isetta Moto Coupe DeLuxe (sliding-window Isetta) was introduced. The bubble windows were replaced by longer, sliding side windows.

BMW 600

The BMW 600 was intended as an enlarged Isetta with more power and a more conventional four-wheel configuration.

The front end of the 600 was virtually unchanged from the Isetta, but the 600's wheelbase was stretched to accommodate four seats. A conventional rear axle was added. BMW introduced the semi-trailing arm independent suspension on the 600. This suspension would be used on almost every new model for the next four decades. Because of the increased size and weight, the 600 had a more powerful engine than the Isetta. The 600 had the 582 cc twin engine from the R67 motorcycle.

In two years, only 34,000 600s were produced, partly due to price competition with the entry-level VW Beetle. In the late 1950s, consumers wanted cars that looked like cars, and they had lost interest in economy models. Sales of the 600 were, however, aided by the energy crisis of 1956–1957.

BMW Isetta (United Kingdom)

In March 1957, Dunsfold Tools Ltd. signed a lease on part of the former Brighton railway works on the south coast of England with the intention of beginning production of the BMW Isetta under licence in May of that year. Shortly afterwards, Dunsfold Tools Ltd was renamed Isetta of Great Britain and the British Isetta was officially launched at the Dorchester hotel in April. The factory had no access by road, therefore components were delivered by rail and finished cars were shipped out the same way.

The British cars had right-hand drive with the door hinged from the right hand side of the car and the steering column moved across to the right as well. Right-hand drive meant that both the driver and the engine were on the same side, so a  counterweight was added to the left side to compensate. Dunlop tyres were used, and Lucas electrics replaced the German Hella and Bosch components, with a different headlamp housing being used. Girling brake components replaced the ATE brake parts.

The Isetta was not popular in the UK until a three-wheeled version was introduced. Although three-wheeled vehicles are more prone to rolling over, there was a financial advantage: they could evade automobile legislation and taxation by being classed as three-wheeled motorcycles, and could be driven with a motorcycle licence. Isetta of Great Britain continued to produce four-wheeled Isettas, but only for export to Canada, New Zealand, and Australia.

In 1962, Isetta of Great Britain also stopped production of the little cars but continued to produce Isetta engines until 1964.

Isetta replica kits
The now defunct British firm Tri-Tech, under the model name Zetta, sold a kit car or even an assembled complete BMW Isetta lookalike replica from modern parts, including Honda CN 250 cc single-cylinder water-cooled engines with automatic transmission (standard) or Kawasaki 500 GPS two-cylinder water-cooled motorcycle engines with optional manual transmission.

Some parts, new or used, were from "donor" vehicles. Front suspension and steering were from the Bedford Rascal (later sold under the Vauxhall marque) or the original and almost identical Suzuki Supercarry light duty van or pick-up. Drum brakes and wheels were from Morris and the subsequent British Leyland Motor Corporation Mini. Prices ranged from c. £2650 for the kit up to c. £9450 for a complete version.

It could be legally registered for use under British laws. Tri-Tech also supplied some body parts which can be used for running non-exact restorations of BMW Isettas.

Microlino

In 2016, Swiss entrepreneur Wim Ouboter, from Micro Mobility Systems, showed a proof-of-concept electric car, the Microlino – based on the original Isetta body design, but with a new chassis and suspension – at the Geneva Motor Show. Production of the vehicle in Italy was set to commence by the end of 2017, but was postponed to late 2018. The company reported in September 2018 it had pre-orders for 8,000 vehicles, which would cost EUR 12,000 each.

See also
Microlino
Peel P50
Heinkel Kabine
Paul Arzens' "L'oeuf"
List of microcars by country of origin

References
Notes

Citations

External links

 Iso Isetta Millennium official site
 1959 BMW Isetta/Hot Wheels WHATTADRAG
 BMW Isetta as built at Brighton’s (former) Locomotive Works
 BMW Isetta on Wheeler Dealers

BMW vehicle series
Iso vehicles
Microcars
Cab over vehicles
Rear mid-engine, rear-wheel-drive vehicles
Rear-engined vehicles
Three-wheeled motor vehicles
Cars introduced in 1953